Boy in the Boat is the thirteenth studio album by the Canadian blues-rock artist 
David Wilcox, which was self-produced. The album was recorded at Reaction Studios, the same studio as his 2002 album Rhythm of Love.

Track listing
All songs written by David Wilcox except where noted.

Personnel
David Wilcox – lead vocals, lead guitar, rhythm guitar, mandolin
Chris Whiteley – harmonica
Richard Bell – keyboard, accordion
Russ Bowsell – bass guitar, backing vocals
Blake Manning – drums, backing vocals

References

External links
Official David Wilcox discography
Stony Plain Records, biography and discography

2007 albums
David Wilcox (Canadian musician) albums
Stony Plain Records albums